Kevin Charles Lewis is a Jersey politician, and Deputy for the island's St Saviour No. 2 district since 2005.

He is Jersey's Transport and Technical Services Minister.

References

External links

Deputies of Jersey
Living people
People from Saint Saviour, Jersey
Year of birth missing (living people)
Government ministers of Jersey